Sir Roy Colin Strong,  (born 23 August 1935) is an English art historian, museum curator, writer, broadcaster and landscape designer. He has served as director of both the National Portrait Gallery and the Victoria and Albert Museum in London. Strong was knighted in 1982.

Early years
Roy Colin Strong was born at Winchmore Hill, London Borough of Enfield (then in Middlesex), the third son of hat manufacturer's commercial traveller George Edward Clement Strong, and Mabel Ada Strong (née Smart). He was raised in "an Enfield terrace sans books, with linoleum 'in shades of unutterable green'", and attended nearby Edmonton County School, a grammar school in Edmonton.

Strong graduated with a first class honours degree in history from Queen Mary College, University of London. He then earned his PhD from the Warburg Institute and became a research fellow at the Institute of Historical Research. His passionate interest in the portraiture of Queen Elizabeth I was sidelined "while he wrote a thesis on Elizabethan Court Pageantry supervised by the Renaissance scholar, Dame Frances Yates who (he says) restructured and re-formed ...[his]... thinking." In 2007 Strong listed his qualifications as DLitt PhD FSA.

Career

National Portrait Gallery
He became assistant keeper of the National Portrait Gallery in London in 1959. In 1967, aged 32, he was appointed its director, a post he held until 1973. He set about transforming its conservative image with a series of extrovert shows, including "600 Cecil Beaton portraits 1928–1968." Dedicated to the culture of the 1960s and 1970s, Sir Roy went on to amuse audiences at the V&A in 1974 with his collection of fedora hats, kipper ties and maxi coats. By regularly introducing new exhibitions he doubled attendance.

Reflecting on his time as director of the National Portrait Gallery, Strong pinpointed the Beaton exhibition as a turning point in the gallery's history. "The public flocked to the exhibition and its run was extended twice. The queues to get in made national news. The Gallery had arrived", Strong wrote in the catalogue to Beaton Portraits, the more recent exhibition of Beaton that ran at the gallery until 31 May 2004.

Victoria and Albert Museum
In 1973, aged 38, he became the youngest director of the Victoria and Albert Museum (V&A), London following John Pope-Hennessy who moved to the British Museum. Strong proved something of a polarising figure condemned by Hennessy in his 1991 autobiography for 'a thirteen years reign that reduced the museum and its staff to a level from which it will not recover for many years'. In his tenure, until 1987, he presided over its The Destruction of the Country House (1974, with Marcus Binney and John Harris), Change and Decay: the future of our churches (1977), and The Garden: a Celebration of a Thousand Years of British Gardening (1979), all of which have been credited with boosting their conservationist agendas. In 1977, following government cuts, he oversaw the closure of the much-lamented Circulation Department of the V&A, which organised tours of the collection around Britain.  In 1980, "he was awarded the prestigious Shakespeare Prize by the FVS Foundation of Hamburg in recognition of his contribution to the arts in the UK."  He was awarded The Royal Photographic Society's President's Medal and Honorary Fellowship (HonFRPS) in recognition of a sustained, significant contribution to the art of photography in 2003.

Television
Among other work for television, in 2008 Strong hosted a six-part TV reality series called  The Diets That Time Forgot. He acted as the Director of the fictitious Institute of Physical Culture, where nine volunteers spent 24 days testing three weight loss diets and fitness regimes that were popular in the late Victorian era (William Banting and his no-sugar diet), the  Edwardian era (Horace Fletcher and his chewing diet), and the 'roaring' Twenties (Dr Lulu Hunt Peters and her calorie-counting diet). The weekly series was first aired on 18 March on Channel 4.

Writing
Strong is a notable scholar of Renaissance art, especially English Elizabethan portraiture, on which he has written many books and articles (see bibliography section). His diaries from 1967 to 1987 were published in 1999, as was The Spirit of Britain: A Narrative History of the Arts, a widely acclaimed 700-page popular history of the arts in Britain through two millennia. In 2005, he published Coronation: A History of Kingship and the British Monarchy.  He had a monthly column in the Financial Times for much of the 1970s and 1980s, and has written articles for many other magazines and newspapers. In 2000 he wrote Gardens Through the Ages and is a patron of the Plantation Garden, Norwich.

Personal life

Marriage
On 10 September 1971, Strong married 41-year-old theatrical designer Julia Trevelyan Oman, at Wilmcote church, near Stratford-upon-Avon, with a special licence from the Archbishop of Canterbury. They enjoyed a belated honeymoon in Tuscany.  She died in 2003 of pancreatic cancer.

Herefordshire
Strong resides in the village of Much Birch in Herefordshire. Here, with his wife, he designed one of Britain's largest post-war formal gardens, the Laskett Gardens. In 1995 he and his wife commissioned the artist Jonathan Myles-Lea to paint a portrait of the house and gardens, which was completed the same year. Since 2010 the gardens have been open to the public by appointment, for groups of more than twenty. An offer by Strong to bequeath Laskett Gardens to the National Trust was rejected in 2014 after it was deemed that they fail to "reach the high rung of national and historic importance". Strong later announced plans to have the gardens "destroyed" after his death. He subsequently relented and in 2015 agreed to bequeath the gardens to the horticultural charity "Perennial" (Gardeners' Royal Benevolent Society).

After leaving the V&A, Strong published a set of diaries that became notorious for its critical assessments of figures in the art and political worlds. It has been rumoured that he has retained a set for posthumous publication. Jan Moir commented in 2002: "His bitchy, hilarious diaries caused a storm when they were published in 1997 and although he has no plans at present to publish another set, he is keeping a private diary again."

Gardening
Strong subsequently designed gardens for Gianni Versace at Versace's Lake Como villa, Villa Fontanelle, and Versace's Miami house, Casa Casuarina. At Versace's behest,  Strong designed an Italian garden at Elton John's residence, Woodside, in Old Windsor, Berkshire.

Anglicanism
A practising Anglican, Strong is an altar server at Hereford Cathedral, as well as High Bailiff and Searcher of the Sanctuary of Westminster Abbey. In this capacity he attended the funeral service of the Queen Mother in 2002. On 30 May 2007, in the crypt of St Paul's Cathedral, he delivered the annual Gresham College Special Lecture, entitled "The Beauty of Holiness and its Perils (or what is to happen to 10,000 parish churches?)," which was deeply critical of the status quo. He said: "little case can be made in the twenty-first century for an expensive building to exist for a service once a week or month lasting an hour," and he wanted to "take an axe and hatchet the utterly awful kipper coloured choir stalls and pews, drag them out of the church and burn them," and "letting in the local community" in order to preserve many rural churches in Britain.

Portraits of Roy Strong 
The National Portrait Gallery Collection has seventeen portraits of Strong including a photo and a sketch by Cecil Beaton and an oil painting by Bryan Organ. An early bronze bust by Angela Conner is on view at Chatsworth House, Derbyshire. In 2005, Strong sat for Jon Edgar for a work in terracotta which was exhibited at Yorkshire Sculpture Park in 2013 as part of the Sculpture Series Heads – Contributors to British Sculpture.

Honours

Strong was knighted in the 1982 New Year Honours and was appointed Member of the Order of the Companions of Honour (CH) in the 2016 New Year Honours for services to culture.

Honorary positions
 Chairman of the Art Department, Arts Council.
 Deputy Chairman, Southbank Centre.
 High Bailiff and Searcher of the Sanctuary of Westminster Abbey, from 2000.
 President, the Garden History Society, 2000–06.
 President, the Friends of Croome Park, from 2008.
 Vice-President Plant Heritage
Patron Broadway Arts Festival 2015

Bibliography
 Portraits of Queen Elizabeth I (Clarendon Press, London, 1963)
 Leicester's Triumph (Leiden: Leiden University Press, and Oxford: Oxford University Press, 1965), with J. A. van Dorsten.
 The English Icon (Paul Mellon Centre for Studies in British Art, London, 1969)
 Tudor & Jacobean Portraits in the National Portrait Gallery (Her Majesty's Stationery Office, London, 1969)
 Nicholas Hilliard (Michael Joseph Ltd, London, 1975) 
 The Cult of Elizabeth: Elizabethan Portraiture and Pageantry (Thames & Hudson, 1977) 
 The Renaissance Garden in England (London, 1979)
 Artists of the Tudor Court: The Portrait Miniature Rediscovered 1520–1620 (V&A Publishing, London, 1983)
 Creating Small Gardens (Conran Octopus, London, 1986) 
 Henry Prince of Wales & England's Lost Renaissance (Thames & Hudson, London, 1986)
 Gloriana: The Portraits of Queen Elizabeth I (Thames & Hudson, London, 1987) 
 A Small Garden Designer's Handbook (Conran Octopus, London, 1987) 
 Lost Treasures of Britain: Five Centuries of Creation and Destruction (Viking Press, London, 1990) 
 The Tudor and Stuart Monarchy: Pageantry, Painting, Iconography, Vol. 1 (The Boydell Press, 1990)
 A Country Life: At Home in the English Countryside (illustrated by Julia Trevelyan Oman) (St Martin's Press, 1994) 
 William Larkin: Icons of Splendour (Franco Maria Ricci, 1995)
 Country Life, 1897–1997: The English Arcadia (1996) 
 The Tudor and Stuart Monarchy: Pageantry, Painting, Iconography, Vol. 2: Elizabethan (The Boydell Press, 1996)
 The Roy Strong Diaries 1967–1987 (Weidenfeld & Nicolson, 1997) 
 The Tudor and Stuart Monarchy: Pageantry, Painting, Iconography, Vol. 3: Jacobean and Caroline (The Boydell Press, 1997)
 The Story of Britain: A People's History (Weidenfeld & Nicolson, 1998) 
 The Spirit of Britain: A Narrative History of the Arts (Jonathan Cape, 1999) 
 The Artist & the Garden (Yale University Press (Paul Mellon Centre for Studies in British Art), 2000) 
 Gardens Through the Ages (Conran Octopus, 2000) 
 Feast: A History of Grand Eating (Jonathan Cape, 2002) 
 The Laskett: The Story of a Garden (Transworld, 2004) 
 Beaton Portraits (with Terence Pepper and Peter Conrad) (Yale University Press, 2004) 
 Coronation: A History of Kingship and the British Monarchy (HarperCollins, 2005) 
 Passions Past and Present (Pimlico, 2005) 
 A Little History of the English Country Church (Random House, 2007) 
 Remaking a Garden: The Laskett Transformed (Frances Lincoln Publishers, 2014) 
 The Roy Strong Diaries 1987–2003 (Weidenfeld & Nicolson, 2017)

Journal articles

Archives 
A number of institutions hold the papers of Roy Strong. These include the National Portrait Gallery, the Bodleian Libraries and the Paul Mellon Centre. The National Portrait Gallery holds Strong's correspondence with colleagues and acquaintances, mostly of a semi-personal nature concerning his personal commitments and achievements. The Bodleian Libraries' holdings of Roy Strong papers include manuscripts of his many books on historical, cultural and artistic subjects; personal diaries, correspondence and material relating to the Laskett garden. The Paul Mellon Centre holds the research material compiled by Strong in the process of writing his publications on Tudor and Stuart art.

References

External links 
 The Roy Strong Archive, Paul Mellon Centre 
 Papers of Sir Roy Strong, National Portrait Gallery

 
 The Laskett Gardens Official Website
 Portraits in the National Portrait Gallery, London
Edmonton County former pupils
Julia Trevelyan Oman Archive at the University of Bristol Theatre Collection, University of Bristol
Roy Strong, After She'd Gone, The Guardian, 21 October 2006
 Alan Strachan, Julia Trevelyan Oman, Leading designer for theatre, ballet and opera (obituary), The Independent, 13 October 2003

1935 births
Living people
Directors of the National Portrait Gallery, London
Directors of the Victoria and Albert Museum
English Anglicans
English art historians
English curators
English autobiographers
English non-fiction writers
English television presenters
English landscape and garden designers
Alumni of Queen Mary University of London
Alumni of the Warburg Institute
High Stewards of Westminster Abbey
Fellows of the Royal Society of Literature
Fellows of the Society of Antiquaries of London
Knights Bachelor
People from Winchmore Hill
English male non-fiction writers
Members of the Order of the Companions of Honour
Country Life (magazine) people